Nikolaos (Nikólaos) is a common Greek given name which means "Victor of People", a compound of νίκη nikē 'victory' and λαός laos 'people'. The connotation is "people's champion" or "conqueror of people".  The English form is Nicholas.  In the bible, this is the name of a proselyte of Antioch and one of the seven deacons of the church at Jerusalem.

People with first name Nikolaos 

In sports:

 Nikolaos Andreadakis, Greek athlete
 Nikolaos Andriakopoulos, Greek gymnast
 Nikolaos Balanos, Greek architect
 Nikolaos Dorakis, Greek shooter
 Nikolaos Georgantas (1880-1958), Greek athlete
 Nikolaos Georgeas, former Greek football player who last played for AEK Athens FC
 Nikolaos Giantsopoulos (born 1994), Canadian soccer player
 Nikolaos Kaklamanakis, Greek gold-medal winner who lit the Olympic torch in the opening ceremony of the 2004 Summer Olympics
 Nikolaos Levidis, Greek shooter
 Nikolaos Lyberopoulos (b. 1975), Greek football player
 Nikolaos Michopoulos, Greek professional football player
 Nikolaos Efthimiou (1990-1993), Greek football athlete for AEK then the Dallas Sidekicks for 1993-1999
 Nikolaos Morakis, Greek shooter
 Nikolaos Siranidis, Greek diver who competed in the synchronised 3-metre springboard competition at the 2004 Summer Olympics
 Nicolaos Trikupis, Greek Shooter, Politician, and Army General
 Nikolaos Tsiantakis (b. 1963), retired Greek football midfielder

In other fields:

 Prince Nikolaos of Greece and Denmark (b. 1969)
 Nikolaos Chalikiopoulos Mantzaros (1795-1872), Greek composer
 Nikolaos Damaskenos, Syrian historian and philosopher in the Augustan age of the Roman Empire
 Nikolaos Douvas, (b. 1947), former Chief of Staff of the Hellenic Army
 Nikolaos Kavadias (1910–1975), Greek poet and writer
 Nikolaos Makarezos (1919-2009), Greek army general
 Nikolaos Mantzaros (1795-1872), Greek composer
 Nikolaos Mavrogenis (d. 1790), Phanariote Prince of Wallachia
 Nikolaos Oikonomides (1934-2000), notable Greek Byzantinist
 Nikolaos Plastiras (1883-1953), General of the Greek army
 Nikolaos Sifounakis, (b. 1949), Greek politician
 Nikolaos Skoufas (1779-1818), member of Filiki Eteria
 Nikolaos Trikoupis, Major General with the Greek Army during the Greco-Turkish War of 1919-1922
 Nikolaos Xydias Typaldos (1826-1909), Greek painter
 Nikolaos Zachariadis (1903-1973), General Secretary of the Communist Party of Greece

In fiction:
 Nikolaos is the Master Vampire of the City of St. Louis in Laurell K. Hamilton's novel Guilty Pleasures.

See also 
 Nikos, the diminutive form of the name  
 Nikol
 Nikolaus (given name)
 Nicholas for use of the name in English
 Agios Nikolaos, various places in Greece and Cyprus
 Niccolò

Greek masculine given names